William McLeish Smith (November 25, 1910 – March 7, 1967) was an American saxophonist and one of the major alto saxophone players of the swing era. He also played clarinet and sang.

Early life
Smith was born in Charleston, South Carolina, United States, and raised in Charleston and attended Avery Institute. His first instrument was clarinet, and his education was in chemistry. He received his chemistry degree from Fisk University, an HBCU.

Career
In 1929, Smith became an alto saxophonist for Jimmie Lunceford's band, becoming one of the main stars in the group. In 1940, he led his own quintet as a side project. His success with Lunceford had lost its charms by 1942, as he now wanted more pay and less travel. Smith moved to the Charlie Spivak orchestra for a year, and was in the United States Navy for another year. He then switched to Harry James's orchestra, where he made more money, and stayed with him for seven years. After that he worked with Duke Ellington and Billy May. He was also part of the Gene Krupa Trio, and can be heard on the 1952 live Verve album, The Drum Battle, part of the Jazz at the Philharmonic series (the 'battle' was with Buddy Rich). In 1954, he returned to Harry James's band.

Personal life
Smith died of cancer on March 7, 1967, in Los Angeles, California, at the age of 56.

Playing style
Jazz critic John S. Wilson described Smith as "one of the triumvirate of great jazz alto saxophonists before Charlie Parker arrived. The other two were Johnny Hodges, who had a fat, luscious tone, and Benny Carter, a model of clean, pure-toned playing. Stylistically, Smith fell between Carter and Hodges for he combined some of Carter's clarity and singing directness with a variant of Hodges' gut sound."

Discography

As sideman
With Louis Bellson
 Journey Into Love (Norgran, 1954)
 Skin Deep (Norgran, 1955)
 Drumorama! (Verve, 1957)
 Music, Romance and Especially Love (Verve, 1957)

With Nat King Cole
 After Midnight (Capitol, 1956)
 The Piano Style of Nat King Cole (Capitol, 1956)
 Nat King Cole and Lester Young (Crown, 1964) 

With Harry James
 Harry James in Hi-fi (Capitol, 1955)
 Jazz Session (Columbia, 1955)
 Juke Box Jamboree (Columbia, 1955)
 More Harry James in Hi-fi (Capitol, 1956)
 Wild About Harry! (Capitol, 1957)
 The New James (Capitol, 1958)
 Harry's Choice! (Capitol, 1958)
 Harry James and His New Swingin' Band (MGM, 1959)
 Harry James...Today! (MGM, 1960)
 The Spectacular Sound of Harry James (MGM, 1961)
 Harry James Plays Neal Hefti (MGM, 1961)
 Requests On-the-Road (MGM, 1962)
 Double Dixie (MGM, 1963)
 Harry James and His Orchestra 1948–49 (1969)

With Gene Krupa
 The Exciting Gene Krupa (Clef, 1953)
 Drum Boogie (Clef, 1956)
 The Drum Battle (Verve, 1960)

With others
 Duke Ellington, Seattle Concert (RCA Victor, 1952)
 Stan Getz, Groovin' High (Modern, 1956)
 Dizzy Gillespie, Jazz Recital (Norgran, 1955)
 Lionel Hampton, With the Just Jazz All-Stars (GNP, 1955)
 Billie Holiday, Lady Sings the Blues (Cleft, 1956)
 Barney Kessel, Modern Jazz Performances from Bizet's Opera Carmen (Contemporary, 1959)
 Jimmie Lunceford, Lunceford Special (Columbia, 1967)
 Jimmie Lunceford, Stomp It Off (GRP, 1992)
 Billy May, Today! (Capitol, 1966)
 Rose Murphy, Not Cha-Cha but Chi-Chi (Verve, 1957)
 Red Norvo, Red Plays the Blues (RCA Victor, 1958)
 Andre Previn, Previn at Sunset (Polydor, 1972)
 Googie René, Romesville (Class, 1959)
 Kay Starr, Portrait of a Starr (Sunset, 1966)
 Charlie Barnet Charlie Barnet Big Band -1967 (Vault, 1966)

References

External links
 Willie Smith recordings at the Discography of American Historical Recordings.

1910 births
1967 deaths
Jazz alto saxophonists
Fisk University alumni
Musicians from Charleston, South Carolina
Duke Ellington Orchestra members
Deaths from cancer in California
20th-century American musicians
Musicians from Cleveland
20th-century saxophonists